The  was a bank robbery committed by members of the Japanese Communist Party in Shōwa-era Imperial Japan. The bank robbery was dubbed the Omori Gang affair.

Background
On 6 October 1932, three party members stole 32,000 yen from the Kawasaki Daiichi Bank in a desperate attempt to obtain funds for party operations. The plan was unknown to all but one member of the central committee. The robbery badly discredited the party in the eyes of the public. The government took full advantage of the incident and subsequent trial to portray the party as a nest of gangsters, leading to the destruction of the Party.

Perpetrators
Yusho Otsuka, who was the brother-in-law of Hajime Kawakami, hatched a plan to procure desperately needed funds for the party. He and an accomplice had held up the main branch of the Kawasaki Bank in Omori. He had used Kawakami's younger daughter, Yoshiko, to "drive alongside him in the getaway car to lend an air of respectability to their group escape." Yoshiko and Otsuka were able to outwit the police. Biographer Yasutaka Saegusa believes that the writer Osamu Dazai was indirectly involved in the Omori Gang bank robbery.

Arrests
The robbery put a high price on Otsuka's head. Otsuka decided to discontinue his visits to Kawakami. In October 1932 police arrested party members involved in the armed robbery.

References

Bank robberies
Japanese Communist Party
1932 in Japan
1932 crimes in Japan
Robberies in Japan
Terrorist incidents in the 1930s